The 1947 LEN European Aquatics Championships were held 10–14 September 1947 in Monte Carlo, Monaco.

Medal table

Medal summary

Diving
Men's events

Women's events

Swimming
Men's events

Women's events

Water polo

See also
List of European Championships records in swimming

References

European Championships
European Aquatics Championships
LEN European Aquatics Championships
International sports competitions hosted by Monaco
Swimming competitions in Monaco
September 1947 sports events in Europe